Castle of Doom Studios, created in 2005 by record producer Tony Doogan and Mogwai, is a recording studio in Glasgow, Scotland.

Overview
It has been used by such artists as Mogwai, Malcolm Middleton, The Magnificents, Belle & Sebastian, Dirty Pretty Things, and Errors. The studios are located on Woodlands Road, in Glasgow. The studios are featured in the documentary film The Recording of Mr. Beast. Barry Burns has commented on the studio:
Stuart Braithwaite has also commented on the studio, saying:

Releases recorded in Castle of Doom
Mogwai – Mr Beast
Mogwai – Zidane: A 21st Century Portrait
Mogwai – Hardcore Will Never Die But You Will
Mogwai – Rave Tapes
Errors – How Clean Is Your Acid House?
Malcolm Middleton – A Brighter Beat
The Magnificents – Year of Explorers
Art-School – Paradise Lost

The Paddingtons – No Mundane Options
Must Be Something – "Give Up The Ghost"
Russian Red - Fuerteventura
The Fountain soundtrack
Twilight Sad - Nobody Wants to Be Here and Nobody Wants to Leave
Mogwai - Atomic
Anathema - The Optimist (Anathema album)
Els Amics de les Arts - Un estrany poder

References

External links
Castle of Doom Studios Myspace

Mogwai
Recording studios in Scotland